Roger Chapman or Chepman (fl. 1391–1404) was an English politician.

He was a Member (MP) of the Parliament of England for Wells in 1391, September 1397, 1402 and January 1404.

References

14th-century births
15th-century deaths
English MPs 1391
English MPs September 1397
English MPs 1402
English MPs January 1404
14th-century English politicians
15th-century English politicians
Politicians from Somerset